Álvaro Obregón is a village located in Othón P. Blanco Municipality, in the Mexican state of  Quintana Roo.

References

Populated places in Quintana Roo